Nelson Germán Bernal (born 24 January 1972 in Paraguay) is a Paraguayan goalkeeper coach for Primera Division Paraguaya club 12 de Octubre Football Club and a former goalkeeper. Bernal retired from professional football in 2016 and returned as a fill-in goalkeeper for 12 de Octubre in the 2021 Primera Division Paraguaya season.

Career

2004 season
Bernal played for Guarani during the 2004 season, his last game for the club was against Cerro Porteño.

2006 season
In 2006, Bernal was a goalkeeper for Club Sportivo San Lorenzo in the Primera B, the Paraguayan third-tier. Later, he was active until 2016 in San Lorenzos League, the Paraguayan fourth-tier.

2021 season
On 20 February 2021, Bernal played five minutes of the 2021 season, coming on as a replacement for Mario Fleitas in a 5-0 defeat to Sol de America.

References

External links
 Soccerway Profile

1972 births
Living people
Paraguayan footballers
Association football goalkeepers
Club Sportivo San Lorenzo footballers
Club Guaraní players
Deportivo Capiatá managers